The 2020–21 3. Liga was the 13th season of the 3. Liga. It began on 18 September 2020 and concluded on 22 May 2021. The season was originally scheduled to begin on 24 July 2020 and conclude on 15 May 2021, though this was delayed due to postponement of the previous season as a result of the COVID-19 pandemic.

The fixtures were announced on 20 August 2020.

Dynamo Dresden and Hansa Rostock got promoted directly, while FC Ingolstadt won the promotion play-offs. Originally, SV Meppen, Bayern Munich II, VfB Lübeck and SpVgg Unterhaching were relegated; however, KFC Uerdingen was unable to obtain a 3. Liga license for the 2021–22 season and was therefore relegated, sparing SV Meppen from relegation.

Effects of the COVID-19 pandemic
Unlike other competitions organised by the DFB and DFL, the clubs of the 3. Liga initially voted to allow for only three substitutes during the 2020–21 season. Five substitutions were permitted in the 3. Liga at the end of the previous season to lessen the impact of fixture congestion caused by the COVID-19 pandemic, and competition organisers had the option to use the rule until 2021. On 11 January 2021, the DFB Executive Committee approved the use of five substitutions for the second half of the season from 22 January (matchday 20 onward), following a secondary vote by the 20 clubs. However, the number of players permitted on the bench remained at seven. Rescheduled matches from the first half of the season (matchday 19 and earlier) remained limited to three substitutions.

Teams

Team changes

Stadiums and locations

1 Bayern Munich II will play their home match against 1. FC Magdeburg at FC Bayern Campus to take strain off the Grünwalder Stadion, since it is being used by three teams and would have to host four matches in one week otherwise.
2 Türkgücü München will play up to eight of their home matches at the Olympiastadion and the remainder at the Grünwalder Stadion.
3 1. FC Saarbrücken played their home match against VfB Lübeck at the PSD Bank Arena in Frankfurt and their home match against 1860 Munich at the Hermann-Neuberger-Stadion in Völklingen because their regular home stadium was rendered unusable due to snowfall.
4 KFC Uerdingen played their first ten home matches at the Merkur Spiel-Arena in Düsseldorf while their home stadium, the Grotenburg-Stadion in Krefeld, is being renovated. The club moved to the Stadion am Lotter Kreuz in Lotte for the rest of the season since they could no longer afford to pay the rent for the Merkur Spiel-Arena.
5 SC Verl will play their home matches at the Benteler-Arena since their home stadium, the Sportclub Arena in Verl, did not meet 3. Liga standards. As only a limited number of spectators was permitted, the DFB allowed Verl to play three matches in their home stadium.

Personnel and kits

Managerial changes

League table

Results

Top scorers

Number of teams by state

Notes

References

2020–21 in German football leagues
2020–21
Germany